Morchella brunnea is a species of fungus in the family Morchellaceae. Described as new to science in 2012, it is known from Oregon, where it fruits under hardwood trees.

References

External links

brunnea
Edible fungi
Fungi described in 2012
Fungi of North America